Epsilon Sigma Alpha International is a community and collegiate service organization for anyone ages 18 and older.  The organization states that its purpose "is to inspire leadership and service by bringing good people together to pursue programs and projects that make a positive difference locally, nationally and internationally."

The organization's mission statement reads: "ESA is Good Friends, Good Works, and Good Times… We create activities and support causes that let us surround ourselves with welcoming, positive people who enjoy making a difference and having fun together."

Established in 1929, ΕΣΑ is a network of an estimated 10,000 members in over 1,000 community based chapters, with coordinating organizations at state and international levels. ΕΣΑ also includes United States collegiate chapters which provide charitable service to their campuses and communities.  All service by ΕΣΑ members is unpaid, with membership fees covering large portions of administrative and chapter expenses.

Philanthropic projects  
Chapters, both independently and jointly, conduct fund raising activities for charitable causes. As the care and expenses of handicapped children are a current ESA priority, the international Philanthropic Projects of Epsilon Sigma Alpha are St. Jude Children's Research Hospital and the Easter Seal Society.  As of July 2006, ΕΣΑ had raised over 100 million dollars for St. Jude's Children's Research Hospital, meeting an organization goal for their 75th anniversary.   As of 2019, ΕΣΑ has helped raise more than $245 million in cash and pledges for the kids of St. Jude.   ΕΣΑ has endowed the St. Jude Bone Marrow Transplant area in the hospital's Patient Care Center and the fourth floor of the ALSAC Tower.

Through their efforts to raise awareness and funds, ΕΣΑ helps support Easterseals and has been a supporter of Easterseals since 1982 when they were adopted as a second International Project.  Since that date ΕΣΑ has raised over $6 million.

ΕΣΑ also encourages each local chapter to select and support local benevolent, charitable or civic enterprises. ΕΣΑ activities on local levels may be jointly organized with men's fraternal organizations, including the Lions Clubs International.  As a whole, the chapters have created an impressive record of service. Each year, members help raise millions of dollars for philanthropic projects and give an estimated 650,000 hours of personal service.

In addition, the ΕΣΑ Foundation supports education through an ongoing Scholarship/Endowment Program and provides grants to individuals involved in charitable service for children and adults.

History 
Adelia Prichard of Oregon, a National President of Business and Professional Women's Clubs from 1923 to 1925, spearheaded the sorority's organization by proposing a national education and service sorority. In 1929, a group of community oriented women in Jacksonville, Texas drafted an organization charter.  With ten signatures, a national charter was issued to ΕΣΑ by the state of Missouri on February 11, 1930. The organization still functions under the original charter but is now incorporated in the state of Colorado.

Prichard was appointed the first National Director, and spearheaded the sorority's early growth.  She asked prominent women from around the United States to serve as members of the Founder's Chapter and to act as advisors.  The chapter included Pearl Kinman; Clara Leach; Althea Terry, State President of the Business and Professional Clubs; Susan. B. Rebhan, a State Supreme Court Judge; Florence Sterling, writer and editor; Phoebe Kerrick Warner, author and National Chairman of the Rural Women's Clubs; businesswoman Florence Crawford; teacher Daisy Birchfield; and Mary Redfield Plummer, lecturer on parliamentary law at Northwestern University.  The first National Headquarters office was located in Kansas City, Missouri, with a central states divisional office in St. Louis.

Director Sybil Murphy Flaherty organized the first National Convention in 1938. Two chapters in Kansas City hosted the convention with about 60 delegates attending.  At that time, delegates set up a National Advisory Council (the forerunner of the present International Council), and elected Irene Copeland Lugland of Kansas City as the first National President.

During World War II, ΕΣΑ National Headquarters sponsored an “Empty Your Purse for Uncle Sam” campaign, one of the first nationally organized activities of the organization. In this door to door campaign, members collected metal for recycling into munitions.  ΕΣΑ also collected books and other reading material for distribution to soldiers around the world.  Local projects to assist the war effort were encouraged, and many chapters enrolled and sponsored Red Cross courses to combat local emergencies.

In 1948, an ΕΣΑ chapter was organized in Voorsburg, in the Netherlands. The name of the National Advisory Council was then changed to the International Advisory Council.  Since then, Epsilon Sigma Alpha chapters have been organized in Germany, Guam, Denmark, Peru, Australia, Mexico, the Philippines, and Scotland.

In 1988 the first collegiate chapter was formed, on the campus of Ball State University.

Emblems and symbols
Emblems associated with ΕΣΑ include the Greek letters Epsilon Sigma Alpha (ΕΣΑ). A national emblem is versioned, based on the needs of local and state chapters.

The yellow jonquil was chosen as the organization's floral emblem as it is "rich in color, perfect in form."  A members magazine, The Jonquil, takes its name from the flower and is published twice yearly.

A streamlined logo was adopted during a brand refresh, consisting of three joined circles surrounding the three English letters representing the name of the society.

Collegiate Chapters
Epsilon Sigma Alpha has the following Collegiate Chapters

Augustana College (Rock Island, IL)
Ball State University (Muncie, IN)
Belmont Abbey College (Belmont, NC)
Bradley University (Peoria, IL)
East Carolina University (Greenville, NC)
Eastern Illinois University (Charleston, IL)
Eastern Kentucky University (Richmond, KY)
Elon University (Elon, NC)
Florida State University (Tallahassee, FL)
George Washington University (Washington, DC)
Illinois State University (Normal, IL)
Indiana State University (Terre Haute, IN)
James Madison University (Harrisonburg, VA)
Kutztown University (Kutztown, PA)
La Salle University (Philadelphia, PA)
Our Lady of the Lake University (San Antonio, TX)
Pennsylvania State University (State College, PA)
Southern Illinois University Edwardsville (Edwardsville, IL) 
University of Florida (Gainesville, FL)
University of Maine at Machias (Machias, ME)
University of Pittsburgh (Pittsburgh, PA)
University of South Carolina (Columbia, SC)
Virginia Tech (Blacksburg, VA)

Charitable Connections
 Affiliation with St. Jude Children's Research Hospital: St. Jude Web site
 Affiliation with Easter Seals: Easter Seals Web site

References

External links 
 
 Charitable Entity Registration - State of Washington

Student organizations established in 1929
Fraternities and sororities in the United States
St. Jude Children's Research Hospital
Charity fundraisers
1929 establishments in Texas